The Russian Cup 1995–96 was the fourth season of the Russian football knockout tournament since the dissolution of Soviet Union.

First round
April 8, 1995.

April 22, 1995.

April 26, 1995.

April 27, 1995.

May 3, 1995.

Second round
May 5, 1995.

May 6, 1995.

May 7, 1995.

Third round
May 15, 1995

May 16, 1995.

June 15, 1995.

Fourth round
July 4, 1995.

July 15, 1995.

Round of 32
Russian Premier League teams started at this stage.

Round of 16

Quarter-finals

Semi-finals

Final

Played in the earlier stages, but not on the final game roster:

FC Spartak Moscow: Stanislav Cherchesov (GK), Ramiz Mamedov (DF), Viktor Onopko (DF), Vasili Kulkov (MF), Serhiy Nahornyak  (FW), Valeri Shmarov (FW), Sergei Yuran (FW).

FC Lokomotiv Moscow: Vyacheslav Tsaryov (DF), Yuri Baturenko  (MF), Sergei Zhukov (MF), Yevgeni Kuznetsov (MF), Oleg Garin (FW).

References

Russian Cup seasons
Russian Cup
Cup
Cup